448th may refer to:

448th (Northumbrian) Field Company, Royal Engineers, in the 1st Newcastle Engineers in the British Territorial Army
448th Fighter Squadron, inactive United States Air Force unit
448th Missile Squadron, inactive United States Air Force unit
448th Rocket Brigade, Tactical ballistic missile brigade of the Russian Ground Forces
448th Supply Chain Management Group, inactive United States Air Force unit
448th Supply Chain Management Wing, a wing of the Air Force Sustainment Center of Air Force Materiel Command

See also
448 (number)
448, the year 448 (CDXLVIII) of the Julian calendar
448 BC